Nuri Kandi may refer to:
 Abbas Qeshlaqi
 Mahmudabad, Meshgin Shahr